Cryptic Fate is a Bangladeshi heavy metal band formed in 1993 in Dhaka. They are one of the pioneers of Bangladeshi metal music. Since 1993, they have released four studio albums and several singles in mixed albums. The original lineup consists of singer Iresh Zaker, guitarists K. Sarfaraz Latifullah and Waheduzzaman Khan, bassist Shakib Chowdhury, drummer Farshed Mahmud.

Although, they started out as a heavy metal band, they became Progressive Metal in their second album. Their first studio album, "Ends are Forever", was released in 1995. Their second studio album, "শ্রেষ্ঠ (Greatness)", an album about the liberation war of Bangladesh, was released in 2001. In 2006, they released "দানব (Giant)", their third full-length effort. They released their fourth full-length studio album "নয় মাস (Nine Months)" in 2013.

History

Formation and Early days (1993) 

In February 1993, Wahed and Sarfaraz conceived the idea of forming a metal band. They quickly recruited school friends Shakib, Farshed and Iresh as bassist, drummer, and singer, respectively, and the original line-up was complete. Shakib named the band Cryptic Fate. As the story goes, Shakib was praying when the name came to him.

The original line-up was Iresh Zaker on vocals, Waheduzzaman Khan and K. Sarfaraz Latifullah on guitars. Fazle Shakib on bass and Farshed Mahmud on drums.

Frustrated by the lack of concert opportunities, the band turned to composing. Shakib came up with the riff for Fate's first song "Captors of Fate". Farshed writes the lyrics and names the song. A demo was recorded in Farshed's living room, which receives lukewarm reviews from listeners. Farshed subsequently leaves for US and the band again considers calling it quits. Farshed insists he will return in a year to record a full-length album, and the band agreed to stay together.

"Ends Are Forever" (1994-1995) 

As promised, Farshed returned to Dhaka for summer vacation and the band began writing their first album. Within a month, the band had eight songs ready. Fate enters Soundgarden Studios in July, and starts recording at breakneck speed. It takes only nine shifts to record and mix nine songs. Ends Are Forever was released by Soundtek Productions and enjoyed moderate success despite being an all-English metal album in a pop-saturated all-Bangla market. Farshed returned to the US, soon to be joined by Wahed. Meanwhile, Shakib and Sarfaraz enrolled at Independent University of Bangladesh (IUB), Dhaka, where they later meet guitarist Farhan Samad.

In December, and after a long hiatus from the stage, Cryptic Fate performed at the ICMA Auditorium. The performance brings the house down. In the audience are future guitarist of Artcell, Ershad, and future drummer of The Watson Brothers, Arafat.

"শ্রেষ্ঠ (Greatness)" (1997) 

First solo concert, PG Auditorium. Cryptic Fate opens with their title track “Ends Are Forever” and goes on to perform the entire album, in addition to a slew of covers. The audience goes wild and the concert is a rousing success.
Summer, second album. Once again, Fate returns to Soundgarden Studios. Mobin returns as sound engineer supreme. The album recorded is titled Sreshtho – Cryptic Fate's first Bangla album. 
Sreshtho line-up:
Drums – Farshed 
Guitars – Wahed
Guitars – Sarfaraz
Vocals/Bass – Shakib
The rest of the year the band searches, unsuccessfully, for a production company to release the album. Fate are told metal is out of season. Meanwhile, copies of Sreshtho are leaked to fans, and quickly garner lavish praise from underground listeners.

Lacking a second guitar player, Shakib and Sarfaraz invite Farhan to audition for the band. With a guest drummer on board, Cryptic Fate performs at Agargaon Community Center. Impressed by Farhan's skills, Shakib asks Farhan to join the band (12 July) and Farhan duly obliges. The band is offered a concert at the end of July, but Sarfaraz suddenly leaves for the US for higher studies. Emon (from Jolly Rogers) auditions as lead guitarist but falls short of expectations. Farhan steps in as lead guitarist for the show. His performance is stellar and the band delivers yet another tight set.
The band performs two more shows during the year with help from Gibran (Dethrow) and Rinku as support guitarists.

Cryptic Fate continued to perform at concerts. Sarfaraz returns to Dhaka. Arafat (The Watson Brothers) joins the band as guest drummer. The highlight of the year is an open-air concert at RAOWA Club where Fate performs only two songs (due to time constraint). One of the songs is “Nisshongo”, a single from Sreshtho, and members of Black, Artcell, Dethrow and others, join the band on stage for a memorable performance.

Mixed albums and Shows (2001-2004) 

Cryptic Fate received sponsorship from Pepsi. Sarfaraz temporarily leaves the band due to personal reasons. The band performs a concert at the Army Stadium where they introduce new drummer, Turjo. 
Close to year-end, Fate is invited by Duray to contribute a song to the mixed album Charpatra. Shakib and Farhan collaborate for the first time, and the result is “Cholo Bangladesh” – a cricket anthem that goes on to become Fate's first mainstream hit. 
Charpatra line-up:
Bass/Vocals – Shakib
Guitars – Farhan
Drums – Turjo

Buoyed by the success of Charpatra, Duray decided to produce another mixed album Anushilon, and invited Fate to contribute two songs. The band once again finds itself without a drummer (Turjo is busy with studies). Left with no choice, Farhan and Shakib play drums on “Shokal Choita” and “Eito Cholchey”, respectively. On a more positive note, Sarfaraz returns to the band, composing “Eito Cholchey”. 
A full four years after it was recorded, Sreshtho finally sees light of day, thanks to the band's new label G-Series. The album is an instant hit.

Farshed returns to Bangladesh. First show of the re-united Cryptic Fate is at the Russian Culture Center in March. More shows follow, notably the “ABC” concert at Army Stadium, where Fate unites with Black and Artcell to perform Dream Theater's “Scenes from a Memory”, and Metallica's “Master of Puppets”. The band releases two more singles “Biday” and "Prem" for the Aguntuk mixed album series.

"দানব (Giant)" (2004–2006) 
Cryptic Fate spent the better part of two years writing and recording Danob. The perfectionists they are, the band take their time delivering their much-anticipated follow-up to Sreshtho. The result is nothing short of brilliant. With Danob, Cryptic Fate continues the journey that began 13 years ago. Despite busy professional lives, the members of Fate remain committed to their music, their band, and their fans.

"নয় মাস (Nine Months)" (2013–present) 

Cryptic Fate start working নয় মাস ("Nine Months") a concept album based on the emotions of the 9 months of the Liberation War of Bangladesh. The album will have 9 songs. Each song will be released through Radio,Website & other online music stations.Till now they released 6 songs 
from it.
  
Chowdhury Fazle Shakib said in his Facebook page "We are also working on a 20 years of Cryptic Fate album. 5 old songs remade and re-imagined with our favourite musicians & 5 new songs. "

Band members

Present members 
 Shakib Chowdhury – vocals, bass guitars 
 K. Sarfaraz Latifullah – lead guitars 
 Farhan Samad – rhythm guitars 
 Raef al Hasan Rafa – drums

Past members 
 Iresh Zaker – vocals 
 Waheduzzaman Khan – guitars 
 Farshed Mahmud - drums

Discography

Studio albums 
 "Ends Are Forever" (1995)
 "শ্রেষ্ঠ (Greatness)" (2002)
 "দানব (Giant)" (2006)
 "নয় মাস (Nine Months)" (2013)

References

External links

 
 Cryptic Fate Official Facebook page

Musical groups established in 1993
Bangladeshi heavy metal musical groups
Musical quartets
1993 establishments in Bangladesh